Northern Methodist Episcopal Church of Clarksville, also known as Bryant Chapel AME is a historic African Methodist Episcopal church located at 309 Smith Street in Clarksville, Pike County, Missouri. It was built in 1866 and remodeled in 1915, and is a one-story, rectangular, Greek Revival style brick church.  It has a front gable roof.

It was listed on the National Register of Historic Places in 1991.

References

Methodist churches in Missouri
African-American history of Missouri
African Methodist Episcopal churches in Missouri
Churches on the National Register of Historic Places in Missouri
Greek Revival church buildings in Missouri
Churches completed in 1866
Buildings and structures in Pike County, Missouri
1866 establishments in Missouri
National Register of Historic Places in Pike County, Missouri